This is a list of lakes of Nebraska.

See also

List of lakes in the United States
List of Nebraska fish
List of Nebraska rivers
List of Nebraska streams

Sources

Nebraska Game and Parks Commission Lake Mapping Program
Nebraska Lakes Association
Great Lakes of South Dakota Association
Maps of South Dakota Lakes
SD State Parks and Recreation Areas

Lakes
Nebraska